Cultural Dynamics is a peer-reviewed academic journal that publishes papers three times a year. The journal is edited by the Cultural Dynamics Editorial Collective. It has been in publication since 1988 and is currently published by SAGE Publications.

Scope 
Cultural Dynamics publishes research which focuses on the inequalities of the contemporary world and the ways people negotiate these conditions. The journal is interdisciplinary and covers areas such as anthropology, sociology and history as well as any other areas which may cover culture, power and politics.

Abstracting and indexing 
Cultural Dynamics is abstracted and indexed in the following databases:
  Academic Search Premier
 International Bibliography of the Social Sciences (IBSS)
 GEOBASE
 SCOPUS
 Sociological Abstracts
 SocINDEX (Full Text Collection)
 Zetoc

External links 
 

SAGE Publishing academic journals
English-language journals
Cultural journals
Publications established in 1998